or  is an annual Light Novel convention held in the Tokorozawa Sakura Town. The event hosted five Kadokawa's light novel Imprints, such as Dengeki Bunko, Fujimi Fantasia Bunko, Kadokawa Sneaker Bunko, MF Bunko J, and Famitsu Bunko.

Event History

References

External links
 

Anime conventions
Anime conventions in Japan